Juhani Heikki Kalevi Lahtinen (28 September 1938 – 8 March 2018) was a  Finnish ice hockey player. He was one of Finland's best ice hockey goaltenders. He played for the famous team Ilves in 1964.

References

1938 births
2018 deaths
Ice hockey players at the 1960 Winter Olympics
Ice hockey players at the 1964 Winter Olympics
Olympic ice hockey players of Finland
Ilves players
Finnish ice hockey goaltenders